Benzonia corymbosa is a species of flowering plants in the family Rubiaceae, endemic to Guinea in West Africa. It is the only species in the genus Benzonia. It was described by Heinrich Christian Friedrich Schumacher in 1827.

References

External links
Benzonia in the World Checklist of Rubiaceae

Rubiaceae
Taxa named by Heinrich Christian Friedrich Schumacher